Lingzhi station is an interchange station for Line 5 and Line 12 of the Shenzhen Metro. Line 5 platforms opened on 22 June 2011 and Line 12 platforms opened on 28 November 2022. This station is an underground station. Its Chinese name may have come from 灵芝 (Ganoderma lucidum).

Station layout

Exits

References

External links
 Shenzhen Metro Lingzhi Station (Chinese)
 Shenzhen Metro Lingzhi Station (English)

Shenzhen Metro stations
Railway stations in Guangdong
Bao'an District
Railway stations in China opened in 2011